Cecilia Cole (née Rendall; 1921 – 2 July 2006) was a Gambian politician who was a Deputy Speaker of the National Assembly.

She was nominated to the Gambian parliament by President Yahya Jammeh in January 1997 and was the only female member of parliament in that legislature until 2002. She was also Deputy Speaker of Parliament during this period.

Family 
Her son-in-law was bishop Solomon Tilewa Johnson.

References 

2006 deaths
20th-century Gambian women politicians
20th-century Gambian politicians
Women legislative deputy speakers
Speakers of the National Assembly of the Gambia
Alliance for Patriotic Reorientation and Construction politicians
1921 births
21st-century Gambian women politicians
21st-century Gambian politicians